La Maruja is a village and rural locality (municipality) in the Rancul Department of La Pampa Province in Argentina.  It is named after the daughter of the original owner of the land.

Nearby villages include Ingeniero Foster.

References

Populated places in La Pampa Province